Oldham's leaf turtle (Cyclemys oldhamii) is a species of turtle in the family Geoemydidae.

Etymology
Both the specific name, oldhamii, and the common name, Oldham's leaf turtle, are in honor of Thomas Oldham, Superintendent of the Geological Survey of India. The generic name Cyclemys comes from the Greek κύκλος (kyklos, meaning 'round' or 'circle', referring to the shape of the carapace) and εμύς (emys; 'freshwater turtle').

Geographic range
C. oldhamii is found in Bangladesh, in the terai of mizoram, in Myanmar, Thailand, Vietnam, West Borneo, Sumatra and Java. In addition, Cyclemys oldhami shanensis – sometimes considered a distinct species due to its shell pattern, oft described as looking similar to aged meat - occurs from central Myanmar to Thailand and Cambodia. The type locality was originally given as "Mergui and Siam", and restricted to Mergui by Smith (1931).

Gallery

Hybrid
In Germany, a case of hybridization between a male Cyclemys (oldhamii) shanensis and a female Chinese stripe-necked turtle has been described.

See also
Cyclemys

Footnotes

References

  (1918). "Chelonia and Batrachia of the Inlé Lake". Records of the Indian Museum (Calcutta) 14: 67–69.
  (2005). "On the hybridisation between two distantly related Asian turtles (Testudines: Sacalia × Mauremys)". Salamandra 41: 21–26. PDF fulltext
  (1997). "Revision der südostasiatischen Dornschildkröten-Gattung Cyclemys Bell 1834, mit Beschreibung einer neuen Art ". Salamandra 33 (3): 183–212. (in German).
  (1863). "Observations on the box tortoises, with the Descriptions of Three New Asiatic species". Proceedings of the Zoological Society of London 1863: 173–179. (Cyclemys oldhamii, new species, p. 178).
  (1864). "Observations on the box tortoises, with the Descriptions of Three New Asiatic species". Annals and Magazine of Natural History, Third Series 13: 105–111.
  (2002). "New data on the diversity of the Southeast Asian leaf turtle genus Cyclemys BELL, 1834. Molecular results (reptilia: Testudines: Geoemydidae)". Faunistische Abhandlungen des Staatlichen Museums für Tierkunde Dresden 23 (4): 75–86.
  (2003). "Die Dornschildkröten der Gattung Cyclemys BELL, 1834 ". Draco 4 (13): 37–42. (in German).

Cyclemys
Turtles of Asia
Reptiles of Laos
Reptiles of Myanmar
Reptiles of Thailand
Reptiles of Vietnam
Reptiles described in 1863
Taxa named by John Edward Gray